Ray Sorensen (May 12, 1922 – December 17, 1974) was an American gymnast. He competed in eight events at the 1948 Summer Olympics.

References

External links
 

1922 births
1974 deaths
American male artistic gymnasts
Olympic gymnasts of the United States
Gymnasts at the 1948 Summer Olympics
People from Warren, Pennsylvania
Penn State Nittany Lions men's gymnasts